Sulcomitrella aikeni is a species of sea snail, a marine gastropod mollusk in the family Columbellidae, the dove snails.

Description

Distribution

References

  Kilburn R.N. & Marais J.P. (2010) Columbellidae. Pp. 60-104, in: Marais A.P. & Seccombe A.D. (eds), Identification guide to the seashells of South Africa. Volume 1. Groenkloof: Centre for Molluscan Studies. 376 pp.

External links

Columbellidae
Gastropods described in 2009